The Belgrade International Theatre Festival (abbr. BITEF) is a theatre festival that takes place every September annually in Belgrade, Serbia.

History 
Founded in 1967, BITEF has continually followed and supported the latest theatre trends. It has become one of the most significant culture festivals of Serbia.

During the 1960s, the founders of this festival (Mira Trailović, Jovan Ćirilov and their associates) courageously followed tumultuous events in global theatre teeming with avant-garde explorations. In the 1980s, BITEF showed Belgrade the highest reaches of the art of theatre, thus becoming one of the few festivals comprising both experimental forms and significant classic achievements. In spite of political-economic crisis and embargo, in the final decade of the 20th century, BITEF, thanks to the help of international culture centres, government and non-government organizations, managed to keep abreast with the rest of world, through promotion of new theatre trends and ultimate theatre values.

In 2000, BITEF was awarded a Special Prize by the Jury of the Europe Theatre Prize, in Taormina. BITEF was the first international theatre festival to receive an award from Premio Europa per il Teatro.

Jury 

Important part of every edition of the BITEF festival is the jury. Since the beginning, BITEF has a competitive character, which is why the role of the jury is very important. Members of the jury are important theater creators from former Yugoslavia and the rest of the world.

List of jury members for each edition of BITEF:

1st BITEF: Predrag Bajčetić, Dejan Čavić, Jovan Ćirilov, Ljubomir Draškić Boro Drašković, Borislav Mihajlović - Mihiz, Slobodan Selenić, Mira Trailović, Mlađa Veselinović

2nd BITEF:  Predrag Bajčetić, Dejan Čavić, Jovan Ćirilov, Borislav Mihajlović - Mihiz, Muharem Pervić, Mira Trailović, Milan Žmukić

3rd BITEF: Ljubomir Draškić, Hugo Klajn, Borislav Mihajlović - Mihiz, Borka Pavićević, Miodrag Pavlović, Branko Pleša, Slobodan Selenić, Pavle Stefanović, Mira Trailović, Stojan Čelić, Jovan Ćirilov, Jovan Hristić

4th BITEF: Stanislav Bajić, Predrag Bajčetić, Borislav Mihajlović - Mihiz, Slobodan Selenić, Muharem Pervić, Mira Trailović, Jovan Ćirilov, Jovan Hristić

5th BITEF: Milenko Maričić, Vasko Popa, Zoran Ratković, Pavle Stefanović, Ljuba Tadić, Milorad Vučelić

6th BITEF: Jovan Hristić, Dušan Makavejev, Miodrag Pavlović, Zoran Radmilović, Vladimir Stamenković, Ljuba Tadić, Milorad Vučelić

7th BITEF: Muharem Pervić, Milosav Buca Mirković, Petar Volk, Vladimir Stamenković, Feliks Pašić, Lojze Smasek, Božidar Božović, Žarko Komanin, Ognjen Lakićević, Dejan Penčić-Poljanski

8th BITEF: Predrag Bajčetić, Miroslav Belović, Ljubomir Draškić, Boro Drašković, Tatjana Lukjanova, Ljiljana Krstić, Jelisaveta Sablić, Petar Slovenski, Ružica Sokić, Stevo Žigon

9th BITEF: Mirjana Miočinović, Milosav Buca Mirković, Borka Pavićević, Branko Pleša, Slobodan Selenić, Vladimir Stamenković, Jovan Hristić

10th BITEF: Eli Finci, Muharem Pervić, Dejan Penčić-Poljanski, Slobodan Selenić, Vladimir Stamenković

11th BITEF: Jovan Hristić, Dalibor Foretić, Milosav Buca Mirković, Feliks Pašić, Veno Taufer

12th BITEF: France Jamnik, Jovan Hristić, Dalibor Foretić, Feliks Pašić, Mirjana Miočinović

13th BITEF: Petar Salem, Lojze Smasek, Milorad Vučelić, Slobodan Selenić, Dragan Klaić

14th BITEF: Branko Pleša, Boro Drašković, Olga Jevrić, Dragan Klaić, Dejan Mijač, Ksenija Šukuljević

15th BITEF: Aleksandar Saša Petrović, Filip David, Ljiljana Krstić, Vladan Radosavljević

16th BITEF: Milka Podrug-Kokotović, Miroslava Otašević, Arsenije Jovanović, Slobodan Stojanović, Goran Stefanovski

17th BITEF: Mira Banjac, Borka Pavićević, Nenad Prokić, Slobodan Selenić, László Végel

18th BITEF: Slobodan Glumac, Dubravka Knežević, Branka Krilović, Paolo Magelli, Vladimir Stamenković

19th BITEF: Velimir Lukić, Lada Martinec, Aleksandar Popović, Ivica Kunčević, Zlatko Sviben

20th BITEF: Vladimir Jevtović, Dejan Mijač, Miodrag Pavlović, Nenad Prokić, Jelisaveta Sablić

21st BITEF: Petar Banićević, Petar Brečić, Nenad Ilić, Ljubomir Simović

22nd BITEF: Predrag Ejdus, Anatolij Kudrajcev, Slobodan Mašić, Haris Pašović, Dragoslav Srejović

23rd BITEF: Slobodan Blagojević, Dubravka Knežević, Egon Savin, Ivana Vujić, Dalibor Foretić

24th BITEF: Dragan Klaić, Boro Drašković, Branislav Lečić, Jovan Ristić Rica, Dubravka Ugrešić

25th BITEF: Vida Ognjenović, Mario Maskareli, Predrag Perović, Lidija Pilipenko, Gorčin Stojanović

26th BITEF: Slobodan Novaković, Dara Džokić, Jagoš Marković

27th BITEF: Cvijeta Mesić, Goran Marković, Irfan Mensur, Aleksandar Milosavljević, Mileta Prodanović

28th BITEF: Tanja Bošković, Jerko Denegri, Mladen Popović, Ivana Stefanović, Alisa Stojanović

29th BITEF: Dejan Mijač, Nebojša Dugalić, Srđan Hofman, Vladimir Kopicl, Ognjenka Milićević

30th BITEF: Roman Grigorijevič-Viktjuk, Isidora Minić, Boro Drašković, Nenad Prokić, Hermann Theissenn

31st BITEF: Milorad Pavić, Nikolay Kolyada, Arthur D. Skelton, Biljana Srbljanović, Goran Stefanovski

32nd BITEF: Heinz Klunker, Mira Erceg, Branislava Liješević, Svetlana Vragova, Ivan Medenica

33rd BITEF: Mario Mattia Giorgetti, Natalija Vagapova, Jelena Šantić, Dijana Milošević, Svetislav Jovanov

34th BITEF: Renate Klett, Marina Davydova, Nina Kiraly, Sonja Vukićević, Anja Suša

35th BITEF: Ivica Buljan, Tomaž Toporišič, Roman Dolžanski, Milena Marković, Miško Šuvaković

36th BITEF: Milorad Mišković, Annie Dorsen, Rudy Engelander, Nikita Milivojević, Isidora Stanišić

37th BITEF: Pamela Howard, Milena Bogavac, Igor Bojović, Audronis Liuga, Elie Malka, Alisa Stojanović, Johanna Tomek

38th BITEF: Michael Coveney, Predrag Miki Manojlović, Marija Janković, Milica Konstantinović, Suzanne Osten

39th BITEF: Ian Herbert, Đurđija Cvetić, Ksenija Viktorovna Dragunska, Dušan Makavejev, Uglješa Šajtinac 

40th BITEF: Dino Mustafić, Miloš Sofrenović, Daša Kovačević, Igor Đorđević, Egon Savin

41st BITEF: Tomi Janežič, Miloš Lolić, Olga Stanislavovna Mukhina, Milica Tomić, Kristian Seltun, Laszlo Upor

42nd BITEF: Hans-Thies Lehmann, Mia David, Marija Karaklajić, Constanza Macras, Katarina Pejović

43rd BITEF: Patrice Pavis, Roland Schimmelpfennig, Vladimir Aleksić, Oliver Frljić, Maja Pelević

44th BITEF: Nataša Rajković, Bojan Đorđev, Elena Kovalskaya, Damjan Kecojević, Gianina Carbunariu

45th BITEF: Arthur Sonnen, Anna Lengyel, Alja Predan, Vladica Milosavljević, Nikola Zavišić

46th BITEF: Goran Injac, Jean Pierre Thibodeau, Elizabeth Schak, Đurđa Tešić, Maja Mirković

47th BITEF: Christian Holtzhauer, Yana Ross, Igor Ružić, András Urbán, Filip Vujošević

48th BITEF: Ana Tomović, Lilach Dekel-Avner, Periša Perišić, Ulla Kasius, Witold Mrozek

49th BITEF: Mirjana Karanović, Žarko Laušević, Agnieszka Jakimiak, Stefan Blaeske

50th BITEF: Yun-Cheol Kim, Femi Osofisan, Aleksandra Jovićević, Aleksandar Denić, Tomas Irmer

51st BITEF: Marija Ševcova, Margareta Sorensen, Ivana Sajko, Igor Koruga, Draško Adžić

52nd BITEF: Judit Csaki, Bryce Leace, Bojana Mladenović, Aleksandra Janković, Radmila Vojvodić

53rd BITEF: Christine Hamon-Sirejols, Dorothy Chansky, Sanja Mitrović, Olga Dimitrijević, Ersan Mondtag 

54th & 55th BITEF: Şermin Langhoff, Lucia Van Heteren, Agata Juniku, Cecilia Djurberg, Jovana Tomić

56th BITEF: Stefanie Carp, Christine Doessel, Selma Spahić, Vanja Ejdus, Dino Pešut

List of award-winning performances

See also
 List of theatres in Serbia

References

External links
 

1967 establishments in Serbia
Festivals established in 1967
September events
Theatre festivals in Serbia
Culture in Belgrade
Tourist attractions in Belgrade
Annual events in Serbia
Autumn events in Serbia